The DeLong Star Ruby, a  oval cabochon star ruby, was discovered in Burma in the 1930s.

On October 29, 1964, the DeLong star ruby was one of a number of precious gems stolen in a notorious jewelry heist by Jack Roland Murphy and two accomplices. In January 1965, nine of the stolen gems, including the Star of India and the Midnight Star, were recovered in a bus depot locker; however, the DeLong ruby was not among them. After months of negotiation, the unknown holder of the ruby agreed, through third parties including Dick Pearson, to ransom it for $25,000.  The ransom was paid by wealthy Florida businessman John D. MacArthur and he was present on September 2, 1965, when the ruby was recovered at the designated drop off site: a phone booth at a service plaza on the Sunshine State Parkway near Palm Beach, Florida. Months later Dick Pearson was arrested burglarizing a jewelry store in Georgia and was found in possession of $100 bills with serial numbers matching the ransom money. He was convicted and sentenced to 10 years in prison for his involvement in the DeLong Star ruby case.

See also
 List of individual gemstones

References

External links
The DeLong Star Ruby
100-Carat Delong Star Ruby Recovered Near Palm Beach

Individual rubies
Individual thefts